Nary may refer to:
 Cornelius Nary (1660–1738), Irish priest and religious writer
 Nary, Minnesota
 Nary relation, in set theory

See also
 McNary (disambiguation)
 McNary (surname)